The Egg and I is a 1947 American romantic comedy film directed by Chester Erskine, who co-wrote the screenplay with Fred F. Finklehoffe, based on the book of the same name by Betty MacDonald and starring Claudette Colbert and Fred MacMurray, with Marjorie Main and Percy Kilbride as Ma and Pa Kettle.

The box office success of The Egg and I influenced the production of Universal-International's Ma and Pa Kettle series, which consists of nine feature films most of which star Main and Kilbride together.

At the 20th Academy Awards, Main was nominated for Best Actress in a Supporting Role.

Plot
The film tells the story of a young married couple who become chicken farmers. Betty follows her husband Bob to the countryside where his dream is to be a successful chicken farmer. The problem is, their home is old and needs to be repaired and the baby chicks need constant care. When a rich single woman with a new house and new farm equipment flirts with Bob, Betty questions their decision to move to the farm in the first place. In the end, she finds out that Bob was trying to buy the new house for Betty as a surprise.

Cast

Production crew
 Production Design ....  Bernard Herzbrun
 Set Decoration ....  Oliver Emert / Russell A. Gausman
 Hair Stylist ....  Carmen Dirigo
 Makeup Artist ....  Jack P. Pierce
 Assistant Director ....  Frank Shaw
 Second Unit Director ....  Jack Hively (uncredited)
 Sound Technician ....  Glenn E. Anderson
 Sound ....  Charles Felstead
 Orchestrator ....  David Tamkin
 Composer: Stock Music ....  Sam Perry (uncredited)

Reception
The Egg and I was a box office success, earning $5.5 million in domestic theatrical rentals against its budget of $1.9 million.

Radio adaptations
 The Egg and I was presented on This Is Hollywood on January 4, 1947, with Colbert and MacMurray reprising their movie roles. The adaptation was unusual in that it preceded the film's release. 
 The Egg and I was presented on Hallmark Playhouse January 5, 1950, with Colbert again starring in her movie role. 
 The Egg and I was performed as a one-hour radio play on the May 5, 1947 broadcast of Lux Radio Theatre, with both Claudette Colbert and Fred MacMurray reprising their movie roles.

References

External links
 
 
 
 
 

1947 films
American black-and-white films
Universal Pictures films
Films based on American novels
1947 romantic comedy films
Ma and Pa Kettle
Films about farmers
Films directed by Chester Erskine
American romantic comedy films
Films set on farms
Films set in Washington (state)
Films scored by Frank Skinner
Films about chickens
1940s American films